Pielke is a surname. Notable people with the surname include:

 Roger A. Pielke (born 1946), American meteorologist
 Roger A. Pielke, Jr. (born 1968, son of Roger A. Pielke), American political scientist and professor
 Emil B. Pielke (1942–2008), American politician